Ramathibodi or Ramathipbodi ("Overlord Rāma") was a Thai royal title. All Thai monarchs took Ramathibodi as their formal or ceremonial title, but a few are widely known by it.

It may refer to:

 Ramathibodi I, also known as U Thong
 Ramathibodi II, also known as Chetthathirat
 Order of Rama, known in Thai as Ramathibodi
 Ramathibodi Hospital

See also

 Rama (Kings of Thailand)

Thai royal titles